Rychwałd may refer to the following places:
Polish name for Rychvald in the Czech Republic
Rychwałd, Lesser Poland Voivodeship (south Poland)
Rychwałd, Silesian Voivodeship (south Poland)